Nese is a moribund Oceanic language or dialect known by no more than twenty people in the Matanvat area of the northwest tip of the island of Malakula in Vanuatu. It is now rarely spoken, having been replaced as a primary mode of communication by Bislama.

Nese is one of the few languages to have linguolabial consonants.

References

Further reading

External links
 Austronesian Basic Vocabulary Database wordlist

Malekula languages
Languages of Vanuatu
Definitely endangered languages